Odontomastax is a genus of grasshoppers belonging to the family Chorotypidae.  The single species is Odontomastax poultoni  from Borneo.

References

Chorotypidae
Caelifera genera
Monotypic Orthoptera genera